is an anime series aired from 1976 to 1977. There were 36 episodes. It is also referred to as Gloyzer X and Gloizer X.

Story
The Gaira aliens, hidden in the Arctic, plan to conquer Earth. Captured and forced to work for the aliens, Dr. Yan creates the ultimate weapon, a transformable aerial robot called Groizer X. Groizer X was 100 meters tall and weighed 1200 tons. Entrusted to his daughter Rita, Groizer X escapes the clutches of the Gaira and lands in Japan, where pilot Joe Kaisaka meets a wounded Rita. Taking up the controls of Groizer X, Jo and Rita fight against the Gaira invasion.

Concept
The anime was created by Go Nagai and Gosaku Ota as a side project during the time they were busy with the various Mazinger series, Groizer X nevertheless managed to be converted into a TV series.  The robot transforms into a jet, while the show included intense battle sequences and aerial combat, it remained a secondary super robot series.

Characters

Merchandise
The original Groizer X toyline are one of the very few Super Robot toys produced by Namco instead of the industry dominant Popy.

Yamato then did a GN-U Groizer X figure released in 2007. A Manga version of the figure was produced, only painted in green.

Outside Japan 

While not being a great success in Japan, Groizer X had a considerable impact in Brazil, where it was aired under the name O Pirata do Espaço ("The Space Pirate") in 1984/1986 at the Manchete Network. Only two 70's mecha anime were shown in the country up until that point, and Groizer X was the only one to air in its entirety (Voltes V, the other one, only aired for five episodes). In Latin America, the anime was aired under the name El Justiciero. In Italy it was one of the few robotic anime to be aired on Silvio Berlusconi's Canale 5, in 1981, where it failed to garner much following and was never replayed.

References in other series

In the 2009 anime Mazinger Edition Z: The Impact!, Count Brocken deploys an updated Groizer, "Groizer X-10" to attack Mazinger Z and the Mazinger Corps. Later on, Groizer's X-9, X-11 and X-12 are also shown, used by the Count to sink the Submarine Fortress Saluud.

References

External links

Groizer X  at The World of Go Nagai webpage
Groizer X, LP 

1976 anime television series debuts
Adventure anime and manga
Asahi Sonorama manga
Go Nagai
Knack Productions
Super robot anime and manga
Shōnen manga
TV Tokyo original programming